Woman's Place is a 1921 American romantic comedy film directed by Victor Fleming. It stars Constance Talmadge and Kenneth Harlan. It was produced by Talmadge's brother-in-law, Joseph Schenck and distributed through Associated First National, later First National Pictures.

It is a surviving film in the British Film Institute (BFI) in London.

Plot
As described in a film magazine, Josephine Gerson (Talmadge) is selected by the woman's party as their candidate for mayor and her fiancé accepts the "machine" nomination, and their engagement ends. In her conflict with the boss of the opposition party Jim Bradley (Harlan), mutual love develops with each determined to win. In an election speech as novel as it is effective, Josephine wins the male voters of the pivotal ninth ward. However, her campaign's neglect of the female vote results in her defeat at the polls by 27 votes. Natural gloom at the loss is dispelled when Bradley announces that he has been won over by her policies and appoints her constituents to vital offices, and a happy ending results.

Cast
Constance Talmadge	as Josephine Gerson
Kenneth Harlan as Jim Bradley
Hassard Short as Freddy Bleeker
Florence Short as Amy Bleeker
Ina Rorke as Mrs. Margaret Belknap
Margaret Linden as Miss Jane Wilson (credited as Marguerite Linden)
Jack Connolly as Dan Dowd

References

External links

1921 films
American black-and-white films
American silent feature films
1921 romantic comedy films
Films directed by Victor Fleming
Films with screenplays by Anita Loos
American romantic comedy films
First National Pictures films
1920s American films
Silent romantic comedy films
Silent American comedy films